Fred Crawford or Frederick Crawford may refer to:

Fred Crawford (Alabama politician), Alabama Secretary of State in 1989
Fred Crawford (American football) (1910–1974), American football player
Fred L. Crawford (1888–1957), American politician
Freddie Crawford (born 1941), basketball player
Sir Frederick Crawford (colonial administrator) (1906–1978), British colonial administrator
Frederick C. Crawford (1891–1994), American industrialist and philanthropist
Frederick H. Crawford (1861–1952), Ulster Unionist Council agent who organised the Larne gun-running operation in 1914